The Lufkin Lumbermen were a minor league baseball team that played in the East Texas League in 1916 and the West Dixie League in 1934. It was based in Lufkin, Texas and the 1916 squad was the first known professional team to come from that city. 

The 1934 squad started in Paris, Texas as the Paris Pirates, but moved to Lufkin in late-June. That team featured multiple players of note, including Bob Muncrief, Fred Nicholson, Tip Tobin and Al Unser.

The team finished tied for first place in 1916 and in sixth place in 1934.

References

Defunct minor league baseball teams
Baseball teams established in 1916
1916 establishments in Texas
Defunct baseball teams in Texas
Baseball teams disestablished in 1934
West Dixie League teams
East Texas League teams